The Chicago, Milwaukee, St. Paul and Pacific Railroad South Cle Elum Rail Yard located in South Cle Elum, Washington, was a division point on the Chicago, Milwaukee, St. Paul and Pacific Railroad's Coast Division. It was established by the railroad (also known as The Milwaukee Road) in 1909 during construction of its "Pacific Extension".

History
After the completion of the first two transcontinental railroads into the Pacific Northwest, the Northern Pacific Railroad and the Great Northern Railway, The Milwaukee Road decided that in order to compete, it too must expand into the Northwest. It began construction on the Pacific Extension in 1906 and completed the rail line into Tacoma, Washington in 1909.

The division point was where locomotives were serviced, where train crews came on and off duty, and where trains were sorted and rolling stock stored. In addition, depots or stations were also placed at division points in order for passengers or freight to get on or off trains.

The division point at Cle Elum (in what would be incorporated as the Town of South Cle Elum) was placed between the terminus at Tacoma and the next division point at Othello, Washington. Thus Cle Elum was the last crew change westbound before crossing the Cascade Range at Snoqualmie Pass and going into Seattle, Washington; as well as the first crew change eastbound from Seattle to Othello and beyond to the Midwest, the Twin Cities and Chicago, Illinois.

The rail yard
The rail yard at South Cle Elum consisted of the depot, the roundhouse (now a ruin), the turntable (also a ruin), ash pit, water tank (now a ruin), and the bunkhouse where train crews spent time between shifts. After The Milwaukee Road electrified around 1920, an electric substation and substation operators' residences were also built at the rail yard.

After The Milwaukee Road abandonment and Iron Horse State Park
In 1980 The Milwaukee Road ceased service in Washington. It sold off much of its property. The bunkhouse became a bed and breakfast, the substation operators' houses were taken over by private individuals who continue to live in them. In lieu of paying back taxes, the railroad transferred ownership of the main line and infrastructure to the state. The John Wayne Pioneer Wagons and Riders Association was instrumental in having the State of Washington Department of Natural Resources (DNR) take over the property and create a trail. In honor of the club's activities, the trail was named the John Wayne Pioneer Trail. In 1985, the DNR transferred the trail to the State Parks and Recreation Commission who then created Iron Horse State Park. The remaining buildings such as the depot and substation, as well as the remains of the rail yard were integrated into the park. In 2018 the State Park and Recreation Commission renamed the John Wayne Pioneer Trail to the Palouse to Cascades State Park Trail.

The depot is now a museum operated for the park's benefit by the Cascade Rail Foundation.

Because of the integrity of the buildings as well as the integrity of the setting, the rail yard and associated buildings were listed in the National Register of Historic Places in 2003.

External links
Iron Horse State Park   
Cascade Rail Foundation

References
Holstein, Craig, Robin Bruce, and Charles Mutschler. . National Register of Historic Places Multiple Property Documentation Form. On file at the National Park Service, Washington, DC. 1992.
Satnik, Kathleen, with Mary McCombs and Jason Pries. Chicago, Milwaukee, St. Paul and Pacific Railroad: South Cle Elum Yard (Kittitas County, Washington) National Register of Historic Places Registration Form. Washington, DC: U.S. Department of the Interior, National Park Service, 2003. On file at the National Register of Historic Places, Washington, DC and at the State of Washington Office of Archaeology and Historic Preservation, Olympia, Washington.

Railway stations on the National Register of Historic Places in Washington (state)
Historic districts on the National Register of Historic Places in Washington (state)
Chicago, Milwaukee, St. Paul and Pacific Railroad
Railway stations in the United States opened in 1909
Cle Elum
Transportation buildings and structures in Kittitas County, Washington
Museums in Kittitas County, Washington
Railroad museums in Washington (state)
National Register of Historic Places in Kittitas County, Washington